John Meyrick (or Merick, Mericke, or Merrick), M.A. (1538– 7 November 1599) was an Anglican clergyman who served in the Church of England as the Bishop of Sodor and Man from 1576 to 1599.

Early life and education
He was the natural son of Owen ab Huw ab Owen ab Meyric of Bodeon, Anglesey, and Gwenllian, daughter of Evan of Penrhyndeudraeth, Merionethshire. He became a pupil at Winchester College in 1550, before continuing with his education at New College, Oxford in July 1555, where he was elected a Fellow on 5 July 1557. He graduated with a Bachelor of Arts on 12 December 1558 and a Master of Arts on 26 June 1562. He served as junior proctor at the college in 1565.

Two of his half-brothers, William and Maurice, were also educated at Winchester College and New College, Oxford.

Ecclesiastical career
He was the vicar of Hornchurch in Essex from 1570 to 1574. In 1575, he was nominated Bishop of Sodor and Man by Henry Stanley, 4th Earl of Derby, and received royal assent on 5 November 1575 and again on 13 April 1576. He was consecrated at Lambeth Palace on 15 April 1576 by Edmund Grindal, Archbishop of Canterbury. During his tenure, Meyrick gave William Camden an account of the Isle of Man, published in Camden's Britannia.

After holding the bishopric for twenty-three years, he died in office in Yorkshire on 7 November 1599, aged 61.

References 
 
 
 
 
 

1538 births
1599 deaths
People from Merionethshire
Bishops of Sodor and Man
Alumni of New College, Oxford
Fellows of New College, Oxford
16th-century Church of England bishops